The Regiment "Savoia Cavalleria" (3rd) is a cavalry unit of the Italian Army based in Grosseto in Tuscany. The regiment is the reconnaissance unit of the Paratroopers Brigade "Folgore".

History

Formation 
In 1690 the Duke of Savoy Victor Amadeus II joined the Nine Years' War against the Kingdom of France.On 23 July 1692 the Cavalry Regiment "Savoia" and the Cavalry Regiment "Piemonte Reale" were formed for service in the war. The Savoia was named for the Duchy of Savoy and consisted of nine companies. The regiment fought in 1693 in the Battle of Marsaglia.
 
After the war the regiment was disbanded on 22 November 1699 and transferred its men and horses to the Cavalry Regiment "Piemonte Reale" and the Regiment Dragoons of His Royal Highness.

Cabinet Wars 
The regiment was reformed on 14 April 1701 with eight companies, which were grouped into four squadrons. Each company fielded 50 horses. The same year Duke Victor Amadeus II joined the War of the Spanish Succession and the regiment fought in 1702 in the Battle of Luzzara, in 1706 in the Siege of Turin, in 1708 in the Siege of Fenestrelle, and at Conflans and at Villanovetta. In 1713 the war ended with the Peace of Utrecht.

In 1733 King Charles Emmanuel III joined the War of the Polish Succession on the French-Spanish. In December 1733 the Savoia was increased to ten companies for the war. The regiment fought in 1734 in the Battle of San Pietro and the Battle of Guastalla against Austrian forces.

In 1742 King Charles Emmanuel III joined the War of the Austrian Succession on the Austrian side and the Savoia fought in 1743 in the Battle of Campo Santo, in 1745 in the Battle of Bassignano, and in 1745 in the Battle of Tidone.

On 16 September 1774 the Savoia ceded two of its companies to help form the Cavalry Regiment "Aosta" and from then on consisted of eight companies grouped in four squadrons.

French Revolutionary Wars 
In 1792 King Victor Amadeus III joined the War of the First Coalition against the French Republic. From 1792 to 1796 the Savoia fought against the French Army of Italy. In March 1796 Napoleon Bonaparte arrived in Italy and took command of the French forces, with which he defeated the Royal Sardinian Army in the Montenotte campaign within a month. On 28 April 1796, King Victor Amadeus III had to sign the Armistice of Cherasco and on 15 May 1796 the Treaty of Paris, which forced Sardinia out of the First Coalition. Victor Amadeus III also had to cede the Duchy of Savoy and the County of Nice to France. On 16 October 1796 Victor Amadeus III died and his eldest son Charles Emmanuel IV ascended the throne. On 26 October 1796 King Charles Emmanuel IV ordered to reduce the Kingdom's cavalry forces and the Savoia was reduced to four squadrons. On the same date the company level was abolished.

In fall 1798 France invaded the remaining territories of King Charles Emmanuel IV. On 6 December 1798 French forces occupied Turin and on 8 December 1798 Charles Emmanuel IV was forced to sign a document of abdication, which also ordered his former subjects to recognise French laws and his troops to obey the orders of the French Army. Charles Emmanuel IV went into exile on Sardinia, while his former territories became the Piedmontese Republic. On 9 December 1798 the Sardinian troops were released from their oath of allegiance to the King and sworn to the Piedmontese Republic. The same month the Cavalry Regiment "Savoia" was renamed 6th Cavalry Regiment.

In January 1799 the 6th Cavalry Regiment was disbanded, with two of its four squadrons transferred to the 2nd Piedmontese Dragoons Regiment and two to the 4th Piedmontese Dragoons Regiment.

Restauration 
On 11 April 1814 Napoleon abdicated and on 20 May 1814 King Victor Emmanuel I returned from exile in Sardinia to Turin. On 1 December 1814 King Victor Emmanuel I ordered to reform the Cavalry Regiment "Savoia", which was renamed Regiment "Savoia Cavalleria". On 1 January 1815 the regiment consisted of six squadrons grouped into three divisions.

On 23 June 1819 the regiment became a light cavalry unit and was renamed Regiment "Cavalleggeri di Savoia" (Chevau-légers of Savoy). In June 1823 the regiment formed two new squadrons, which were grouped into a newly formed division. On 24 December 1828 the Savoia provided some of its personnel to help form the new Regiment "Dragoni di Piemonte". On 29 August 1831 the regiment was reduced to six squadrons and a depot squadron, which would have been formed in times of war. On 3 January 1832 the regiment became a heavy cavalry unit again and was renamed Regiment "Savoia Cavalleria".

Italian Wars of Independence 
In 1848-49 the regiment participated in the First Italian War of Independence, fighting in 1848 in the battles of Pastrengo, Santa Lucia, Goito, Sommacampagna, Volta Mantovana, and Milan, and in 1849 in the battles of Mortara and Novara. At Sommacampagna the Savoia captured the flag of the Austrian 48th Infantry Regiment of Archduke Ernest of Austria.

On 3 January 1850 the regiment was reduced to four squadrons, with the Savoia's 6th Squadron ceded to help form the Regiment "Cavalleggeri di Monferrato". In 1859 the regiment participated in the Second Italian War of Independence. On 16 September 1859 the Savoia ceded one of its squadrons to help form the Regiment "Cavalleggeri di Milano" and on 19 October of the same year the regiment was redesignated as Cuirassiers unit and renamed Regiment "Corazzieri di Savoia". Already on 6 June 1860 the regiment resumed to use its previous name Regiment "Savoia Cavalleria".

In 1866 the regiment participated in the Third Italian War of Independence and fought in the Battle of Custoza. In 1869-70 the regiment operated in the area of Nola, Salerno, and Isernia to suppress the anti-Sardinian revolt in Southern Italy after the Kingdom of Sardinia had invaded and annexed the Kingdom of Two Sicilies. In 1870 in the regiment participated in the capture of Rome. Over the next years the regiment repeatedly changed its name:

 10 September 1871: 3rd Regiment of Cavalry (Savoia)
 5 November 1876: Cavalry Regiment "Savoia" (3rd)
 16 December 1897: Regiment "Savoia Cavalleria" (3rd)

In 1887 the regiment contributed to the formation of the Mounted Hunters Squadron, which fought in the Italo-Ethiopian War of 1887–1889. In 1895-96 the regiment provided one officer and 68 enlisted for units deployed to Italian Eritrea for the First Italo-Ethiopian War. On 1 October 1909 the Savoia ceded one of its squadrons to help form new Regiment "Lancieri di Mantova" (25th). In 1911-12 the regiment provided four officers and 27 enlisted to augment units fighting in the Italo-Turkish War.

World War I 
At the outbreak of World War I the regiment consisted of a command, the regimental depot, and two cavalry groups, with the I Group consisting of three squadrons and the II Group consisting of two squadrons and a machine gun section. Together with the Regiment "Lancieri di Montebello" (8th) the Savoia formed the VI Cavalry Brigade of the 3rd Cavalry Division of "Lombardy". In 1916 the regiment fought in the Battle of Gorizia. In 1917 the regimental depot in Milan formed the 1497th Dismounted Machine Gunners Company as reinforcement for infantry units on the front.

In 1918 the regiment fought in the Battle of Vittorio Veneto, after which the regiment, like all cavalry regiments, was ordered to advance as fast as far as possible and so on 3 November 1918 the Savoia was the first Italian unit to reach Udine. The next day, the day the armistice came into effect, the patrols of the regiment had reached Caporetto. For the liberation of Udine the regiment was awarded its first Bronze Medal of Military Valour.

Interwar years 
After the war the Italian Army disbanded 14 of its 30 cavalry regiments and so on 21 November 1919 the II Group of the Savoia was renamed "Lancieri di Vercelli" as it consisted of personnel and horses from the disbanded Regiment "Lancieri di Vercelli" (26th). On 20 May 1920 the Savoia received and integrated a squadron of the Regiment "Lancieri Vittorio Emanuele II" (10th), and received the traditions of the Regiment "Lancieri di Vercelli" (26th). 

In 1935-36 the regiment contributed eleven officers and 535 enlisted for units, which were deployed to East Africa for the Second Italo-Ethiopian War.

World War II 

At the outbreak of World War II the regiment consisted of a command, a command squadron, the I and II squadrons groups, each with two mounted squadrons, and the 5th Machine Gunners Squadron. The regiment was assigned together with the Regiment "Lancieri di Novara" to the 3rd Cavalry Division "Principe Amedeo Duca d'Aosta", which participated in the Invasion of Yugoslavia. In summer 1941 the division was sent to the Eastern front.

On 20 July 1941 the division left Italy and on 13 August 1941 it reached Dniprodzerzhynsk (today Kamianske) on the Dnieper river in central Ukraine. On 1 October the regiment crossed the Dnipro river. From 20 October 1941 the division fought in the battle to take control of Donetsk and Horlivka. For this operation, the regiment was awarded its second Bronze Medal of Military Valour. In the winter of 1942 the regiment was sent to the rear due to the severe loss of horses.

On 15 March 1942 division's two cavalry regiments and the horse artillery regiment, as well as the III Fast Tanks Group "San Giorgio" left the division and formed the Horse Troops Grouping under direct command of the 8th Italian Army. In summer 1942 the Savoia participated in the occupation of Krasnyi Luch.

In late August 1942, the regiment, reinforced by artillery, occupied and defended Yagodnyi to defend the right flank of the 2nd Infantry Division "Sforzesca". On 24 August the regiment charged Soviet forces at Izbushensky. For the defence of Yagodnyi and the charge at Izbushensky the Savoia was awarded with a Gold Medal of Military Valour.

On 17 December the Red Army began Operation Little Saturn and under immense pressure of superior Soviet armored forces the Italian divisions had to retreat from the Don the next day, but the motorized Soviet formations overtook the Italians and forced the Italians repeatedly to fight their way through Soviet defensive lines on their way towards Axis lines. The Savoia's survivors were repatriated and reached Osoppo in Italy on 2 April 1943. After the announcement of the Armistice of Cassibile on 8 September 1943 invading German forces disbanded the regiment in the Emilia.

During the regiment's deployment to russia the regiment's depot in Milan formed the:
 I Dismounted Group "Savoia Cavalleria"
 II Dismounted Group "Savoia Cavalleria"
 VI Road Movement Battalion "Savoia Cavalleria"
 XX Dismounted Group "Savoia Cavalleria"
 XXIV Dismounted Group "Savoia Cavalleria"

After the announcement of the Armistice of Cassibile the commander of the Savoia's regimental depot in Somma Lombardo, Colonel Pietro de Vito Piscicelli was left without orders and on his own initiative contacted the Swiss authorities: at 7:30 pm on 12 September 1943 Colonel de Vito Piscicelli reached the Swiss border above Ligornetto in the Canton of Ticino at the head of a column consisting of 15 officers, 642 troops, 316 horses and nine mules, with weapons, ammunition and food. Colonel de Vito Piscicelli had the complete regimental depot cross the Swiss border to be interned in Switzerland. The Swiss confiscated the weapons and horses, with only the officers allowed to keep their horse and - in some cases - their weapon, and then granted asylum to everyone. The men were sent to the Canton of Bern and officers and troops of the regimental depot remained in Switzerland until the end of the war.

Cold War 
On 15 October 1946 the 3rd Cavalieri Reconnaissance Group was formed in Milan and assigned to the Infantry Division "Legnano". In December 1948 the group was renamed Armored Cavalry Group "Gorizia Cavalleria". On 15 April 1950 the group was expanded to 3rd Armored Cavalry Regiment "Gorizia Cavalleria". The regiment consisted of a command, a command squadron, and two squadrons groups. In October 1950 the regiment formed a third squadrons group.  In 1957 the regiment moved from Milan to Meran, where it was assigned to the IV Army Corps. On 4 November 1958 the regiment was renamed Regiment "Savoia Cavalleria" (3rd).

During the 1975 army reform the army disbanded the regimental level and newly independent battalions were granted for the first time their own flags. On 11 October 1975 the Regiment "Savoia Cavalleria" (3rd) and its II and III squadrons groups in Meran were disbanded. The regiment's I Squadrons Group was reorganized and renamed 3rd Armored Squadrons Group "Savoia Cavalleria" and assigned the flag and traditions of the regiment. The squadrons group consisted of a command, a command and services squadron, two tank squadrons with M47 Patton tanks, and one mechanized squadron with M113 armored personnel carriers. The squadrons groups was assigned to the 4th Alpine Army Corps.

Recent times 
On 23 May 1992 the 3rd Armored Squadrons Group "Savoia Cavalleria" lost its autonomy and the next day the squadrons group entered the newly formed Regiment "Savoia Cavalleria" (3rd). The regiment consisted of a command, a command and services squadron, and a squadrons group with three armored squadrons equipped with wheeled Centauro tank destroyers. On 7 October 1995 the Savoia's flag was transferred to Grosseto in Tuscany, where on the same day the Regiment "Lancieri di Firenze" (9th) was renamed Regiment "Savoia Cavalleria" (3rd). On 9 October the flag of the Firenze was transferred on to the Shrine of the Flags in the Vittoriano in Rome. The Savoia was assigned to the Mechanized Brigade "Friuli". 

On 20 September 2013 the Savoia was transferred from the Airmobile Brigade "Friuli" to the Paratroopers Brigade "Folgore".

Since 2013 members of the Savoia can obtain the military parachuting license and the regiment's 3rd Reconnaissance Squadron "De Leone" is fully airborne qualified.

Operations 
The regiment took participated in the following international operations:
 IFOR and SFOR in Bosnia Herzagovina (1996-1999)
 Operation Alba in Albania (1997)
 KFOR in Kosovo (1999-2001)
 EUFOR Concordia in North Macedonia (2003)
 Operation Ancient Babylon in Iraq (2003-2006)
 UNIFIL II in Lebanon (October 2007 - May 2008, October 2009 - April 2010, October 2012 - April 2013)

Current structure 

As of 2022 the Regiment "Savoia Cavalleria" (3rd) consists of:

  Regimental Command, in Grosseto
 Command and Logistic Support Squadron
 1st Reconnaissance Squadron Group
 1st Reconnaissance Squadron "Abba"
 2nd Reconnaissance Squadron "Marchio"
 3rd Reconnaissance Squadron "De Leone"
 Heavy Armored Squadron "Manusardi"

The Command and Logistic Support Squadron fields the following platoons: C3 Platoon, Transport and Materiel Platoon, Medical Platoon, and Commissariat Platoon. The three reconnaissance squadrons are equipped with VTLM Lince vehicles and Centauro tank destroyers, the latter of which are scheduled to be replaced by Freccia reconnaissance vehicles. The Heavy Armor Squadron is equipped with Centauro tank destroyers, which are being replaced by Centauro II tank destroyers.

See also 
 Charge of the Savoia Cavalleria at Izbushensky
 Paratroopers Brigade "Folgore"

External links
 Italian Army Website: Reggimento "Savoia Cavalleria" (3°)

References

Cavalry Regiments of Italy

Military units and formations established in 1692
Military units and formations disestablished in 1699
Military units and formations established in 1701
Military units and formations disestablished in 1799
Military units and formations established in 1814
Military units and formations disestablished in 1943
Military units and formations established in 1946
Military units and formations disestablished in 1975
Military units and formations established in 1992